Melitopol is a city and a municipality in the eponymous raion in Zaporizhzhia Oblast of Ukraine.

Melitopol may also refer to:

Places
 Melitopol Raion, Zaporizhzhia, Ukraine
 Melitopol railway station, Melitopol, Melitopol, Melitopol, Zaporizhzhia, Ukraine
 Melitopol Air Base, Melitopol, Zaporizhzhia, Ukraine

Other uses
 Melitopol Motor Factory (MeMZ), a manufacturer of engines
 Battle of Melitopol (2022), in the Russian invasion of Ukraine

See also

 Melitopol Offensive, in WWII